Sonal Parihar is an Indian television actress. She has appeared in the serials Bade Achhe Lagte Hain, Kaisa Yeh Ishq Hai... Ajab Sa Risk Hai, Adaalat, and Chakravartin Ashoka Samrat. and is currently working in zee TV's show amma as ghazala. She was also seen in Star Plus's Yeh Hai Mohabbatein. In 2017, she played the role of Amrita Choudhary, Durga's elder sister, Umang's mother in Meri Durga. She was last seen playing the episodic lead, Kiran in &TV anthology series Laal Ishq in August 2019.

References

External links

Living people
Indian television actresses
Year of birth missing (living people)